Tierra Cali is a Regional Mexican band from Michoacán composed of five brothers. The group has had several charting records in the United States; their biggest hit single there was 2009's "Si Tu Te Vas", which reached #2 on the Billboard Regional Mexican charts. The band’s specialty is the Tierra Caliente genre.

Members
Humberto Plancarte (voice and keyboard)
Rafael Plancarte (bass)
Cruz Plancarte (percussion)
Arcadio Plancarte (keyboards)
Efrain Plancarte (drums)

Discography
Tierra Cali (2006)
No Pares No (2007)
El Arroyito (2007)
El Pescado Nadador (2007)
Alegria Calentana (2007)
Enamorado de Ti (2007)
Grandes Exitos Originales (2007)
Mas Alla de la Distancia (2008) U.S. #158
Si Tu Te Vas (2009) U.S. #128
Ultimate Collection "14 Hits" (2009)
Maldito Amor (2010) U.S. #150
En Vivo Desde La Tierra Que Los Vio Nacer (2010)
Un Siglo De Amor (2011)
Entregate (2012)
Románticos del Momento (2013)
Homenaje A Tierra Caliente (2014)
Enamorado De Ti... (Los Creadores Del Sacadito) (2015)
Si Tu Te Vas (Los Creadores Del Sacadito) (2015)
Enamorado De Ti (2015)
#Hashtag Y Lo Más Trending (2015)

References

Mexican musical groups